The GWR 378 Class (also known as the Sir Daniel Class) was a class of 30 standard-gauge 2-2-2 steam locomotives on the Great Western Railway in Britain. They were introduced in 1866, and the class remained intact until 1898. Several were altered to the 0-6-0 wheel arrangement, and the last was withdrawn from service in 1920.

History
Joseph Armstrong designed a class of 2-2-2 standard-gauge passenger locomotives, ten of which were built in 1866 at the Swindon Works of the Great Western Railway (GWR). They were the first standard-gauge passenger tender locomotives to be built at Swindon. In 1869, a further 20 were built, also at Swindon, which differed little from the first 10, although the safety-valve covers were of different shape.

The locomotives were built as follows:

Ten locomotives were numbered 1112–21 when new, in a separate series designated for engines paid for out of receipts as opposed to capital. They were renumbered into the capital list as 577–586 in July or August 1870, when a similar quantity of old  broad-gauge engines were taken out of service.

Two of the 378 class were named when new. No. 378 (built 1866) was named Sir Daniel in honour of Sir Daniel Gooch, who had resigned from the GWR in 1864; as a result, the class was sometimes known as the Sir Daniel class. No. 471 (built 1869) was named Sir Watkin, after Sir Watkin Williams-Wynn; the name was taken from a broad-gauge locomotive of the Sir Watkin class, and the latter locomotive may have received the name Wynn in replacement. The name was removed from no. 471 when it was rebuilt as an 0-6-0 in 1901, but no. 378 retained its name until it was withdrawn in 1898.

Two more were named later on. Nos. 380 and 381 received the names North Star and Morning Star respectively, these being the names of the two oldest members of the broad-gauge Star class, which were withdrawn in 1871 and 1869 respectively. Both 380 and 381 lost their names .

The Sir Daniels worked expresses from London to Wolverhampton, to Worcester, and northwards, later also working into Somerset, south Wales and elsewhere as the standard gauge spread. As late as 1893 Charles Rous-Marten noted a fine run with one of the class on a principal Cornish express  between Exeter and Bristol.

Three of the locomotives – nos. 378, 383 & 479 – were scrapped between 1898 and 1900, but William Dean then began rebuilding the remainder as 0-6-0 goods engines. In 1902, after 23 had been so treated, G.J. Churchward (Dean's successor) decided that no more rebuilding would be carried out, and so nos. 382/6, 478 & 579 were scrapped unaltered in 1903 and 1904.

0-6-0 rebuilds

Between 1900 and 1902, 23 of the Sir Daniel 2-2-2s were rebuilt as 0-6-0s to a design by William Dean. Apart from the provision of new wheels of  diameter, the only alterations necessary were to the frames.

The 0-6-0 locomotives were withdrawn between 1903 and 1920, the last two (nos. 381 & 474) lasting long enough to be placed in the "ungrouped" power classification and "uncoloured" weight classification in 1919.

Notes

Footnotes

Page notes

References

0378
2-2-2 locomotives
0-6-0 locomotives
Railway locomotives introduced in 1866
Scrapped locomotives
Standard gauge steam locomotives of Great Britain
Passenger locomotives